Arman Sedghi is an Iranian engineer and assistant professor at Imam Khomeini International University. He is best known for his scientific achievement in production of low cost carbon fibers, and being highly experienced in fabrication and characterization of ceramic fibers and their composites.

Education
He received Master of Science degree in September 1991 from University of Tehran and PhD in February 1996 from Iran University of Science and Technology. The title of his thesis deals with Carbon–carbon composites.

References

Iranian engineers
Iran University of Science and Technology alumni
Academic staff of Imam Khomeini International University
1964 births
Living people